The 2022 Basketball League of Serbia playoffs are two play-off tournaments that decided the winner of the 2021–22 Basketball League of Serbia season. The playoffs started on 7 May and end in June 2021.

Qualified teams

Personnel and sponsorship

SuperLeague Playoffs 
Teams involved:
 2 lowest-placed Serbian teams from the First ABA League: Mega Mozzart, Borac
 6 highest-placed teams from the Regular season: Zlatibor, Sloga, Vojvodina, Mladost MaxBet, Dynamic VIP PAY, Sloboda

The SuperLeague Playoffs were played best-of-three format (1–1–1).

Bracket 
Source

Quarterfinals 

|}

Game 1

Game 2

Semifinals 

|}

Game 1

Game 2

Game 3

Finals 

|}

Game 1

Game 2

SuperLeague Final Four 
Teams involved:
 3 highest-placed Serbian teams from the First ABA League: Crvena zvezda mts, Partizan NIS, FMP Meridian
 winner of the SuperLeague Playoffs: Mega Mozzart

Bracket 
Source

Semifinals 

|}
On 9 June 2022, Partizan announced withdrawal from the 2022 Serbian League playoffs following numerous fan incidents in the 2022 ABA League Finals. Following their withdrawal, FMP Meridian advanced to the Finals.

Game 1

Game 2

Game 3

Finals 

|}

Game 1

Game 2

See also 
 List of current Basketball League of Serbia team rosters
 2022 ABA League First Division Playoffs
 2021–22 KK Crvena zvezda season

References

External links 
 
 Serbian League at Eurobasket.com

playoffs
2021–22 in Serbian basketball
Basketball League of Serbia playoffs